Norway Township is a civil township of Dickinson County in the U.S. state of Michigan.  The population was 1,489 at the 2010 census, down from 1,639 at the 2000 census.

Communities
The community was named after Vulcan, ancient Roman god of fire.

Geography

Demographics

As of the census of 2000, there were 1,639 people, 630 households, and 468 families residing in the township.  The population density was 18.4 per square mile (7.1/km).  There were 766 housing units at an average density of 8.6 per square mile (3.3/km).  The racial makeup of the township was 98.84% White, 0.06% African American, 0.12% Native American, 0.12% Asian, 0.06% Pacific Islander, 0.06% from other races, and 0.73% from two or more races. Hispanic or Latino of any race were 0.06% of the population. 18.8% were of Italian, 14.5% German, 12.7% Polish, 8.6% French, 7.5% Swedish, 7.2% French Canadian and 5.5% Irish ancestry according to Census 2000.

There were 630 households, out of which 35.1% had children under the age of 18 living with them, 63.5% were married couples living together, 7.0% had a female householder with no husband present, and 25.6% were non-families. 22.1% of all households were made up of individuals, and 10.6% had someone living alone who was 65 years of age or older.  The average household size was 2.58 and the average family size was 3.01.

In the township the population was spread out, with 26.3% under the age of 18, 6.8% from 18 to 24, 27.9% from 25 to 44, 25.0% from 45 to 64, and 14.0% who were 65 years of age or older.  The median age was 39 years. For every 100 females, there were 105.1 males.  For every 100 females age 18 and over, there were 99.7 males.

The median income for a household in the township was $40,000, and the median income for a family was $49,141. Males had a median income of $35,577 versus $25,208 for females. The per capita income for the township was $19,938.  About 5.1% of families and 8.2% of the population were below the poverty line, including 7.6% of those under age 18 and 13.0% of those age 65 or over.

Notable person
 Charlotte Armstrong, mystery novelist and Edgar Award winner, was born in Vulcan.

References 

Townships in Dickinson County, Michigan
Iron Mountain micropolitan area
Townships in Michigan